Whiteley Bank, also spelled "Whitely Bank", is a small village or hamlet on the Isle of Wight, United Kingdom. It is mainly known by the crossroads, now styled as a mini-roundabout, between the A3020, B3327 and Canteen Road to Apse Heath. Whiteley Bank is in Newchurch Parish.

Whiteley Bank is the home of the Isle of Wight Donkey Sanctuary. The Donkey Sanctuary was established in 1987 to provide a safe home for donkeys in distress. It currently houses about 200 animals. It was originally in Newport but had to be moved to Whiteley Bank to accommodate more animals. America Wood is a SSSI located between Whiteley Bank and Shanklin.

It is served by Southern Vectis buses on routes 2 and 3. There used to be a public telephone. Whiteley Bank House is a nursing home in Whiteley Bank.

It was also home to the infamous "One Acre Festival", which saw crowds of no less than 30 people in an acre field, appreciating the islands local bands.

References

External links
Whiteley Bank map
The Isle of Wight Donkey Sanctuary Official website, Isle of Wight Donkey Sanctuary.
A Visit to the Donkey Sanctuary, WightCAM - photographically illustrated guide walks on the Isle of Wight, 2003.

Villages on the Isle of Wight
Animal sanctuaries